The Bilderberg Conference 2011 took place at June 9–12, 2011, and were held in Sankt Moritz, Switzerland at the Suvretta House.

Agenda

 Innovation and Budgetary Discipline
 Euro and Challenges for the European Union 
 the role of Emerging Economies
 Social Networks: Connectivity and Security Issues 
 New Challenges in the Middle East
 Conflict Areas 
 Demographic Challenges
 China
 the Future of Switzerland

Delegates (alphabetical)

 Etienne Davignon, Minister of State
 Josef Ackermann, chairman of the management board and the group executive committee, Deutsche Bank AG
 Marcus Agius, chairman, Barclays PLC
 Keith B. Alexander, commander, USCYBERCOM; director, National Security Agency
 Joaquín Almunia, vice president, European Commission; commissioner for Competition
 Roger C. Altman, chairman, Evercore Partners Inc.
 Matti Apunen, director, Finnish Business and Policy Forum EVA
 Francisco Pinto Balsemão, chairman and CEO, IMPRESA, S.G.P.S.; former prime minister
 Nicolas Baverez, partner, Gibson, Dunn & Crutcher LLP
 Nicolas Bazire, managing director, Groupe Arnault /LVMH
 Franco Bernabè, CEO, Telecom Italia SpA
 Jeff Bezos, founder and CEO, Amazon.com
 Carl Bildt, Minister of Foreign Affairs
 Ewa Björling, Minister for Trade
 Marc J. Bolland, chief executive, Marks and Spencer Group plc
 Peter Brabeck-Letmathe, chairman, Nestlé S.A.
 Oscar Bronner, CEO and publisher, Standard Medien AG
 Mark J. Carney, governor, Bank of Canada
 Henri de Castries,  chairman and CEO, AXA
 Juan Luis Cebrián, CEO, PRISA
 Marc E. Chavannes, political columnist, NRC Handelsblad; Professor of Journalism, University of Groningen
 Süreyya Ciliv, CEO, Turkcell Iletisim Hizmetleri A.S.
 Edmund Clark,  president and CEO, TD Bank Financial Group
 Luc Coene, governor, National Bank of Belgium
 Timothy C. Collins, CEO, Ripplewood Holdings, LLC
 María Dolores de Cospedal, secretary general, Partido Popular
 Frans van Daele, chief of staff to the president of the European Council
 George A. David, chairman, Coca-Cola H.B.C. S.A.
 Anders Eldrup,  CEO, DONG Energy
 John Elkann, chairman, Fiat S.p.A.
 Thomas Enders, CEO, Airbus SAS
 Werner Faymann, federal chancellor
 Ulrik Federspiel, vice president, global affairs, Haldor Topsøe A/S
 Martin S. Feldstein, George F. Baker Professor of Economics, Harvard University
 Clara Ferreira Alves, CEO, Claref LDA; writer
 Douglas J. Flint, group chairman, HSBC Holdings plc
 Ying Fu, Vice Minister of Foreign Affairs
 Paul Gallagher, senior counsel; former attorney general
 Hans Groth, senior director, healthcare policy & market access, Oncology Business Unit, Pfizer Europe
 Tayyibe Gülek Domac, former minister of state
 Victor Halberstadt, professor of economics, Leiden University; former honorary secretary general of Bilderberg Meetings
 Gikas A. Hardouvelis, chief economist and head of research, Eurobank EFG
 Reid Hoffman, co-founder and executive chairman, LinkedIn
 Huang Yiping, professor of economics, China Center for Economic Research, Peking University
 Chris R. Hughes, co-founder, Facebook
 Kenneth M. Jacobs, chairman and CEO, Lazard
 Barbara Janom Steiner, head of the Department of Justice, Security and Health, Canton Grisons
 Ole Johansson, chairman, Confederation of the Finnish Industries EK
 James A. Johnson, vice chairman, Perseus, LLC
 Vernon E. Jordan jr., senior managing director, Lazard Frères & Co. LLC
 John M. Keane,  senior partner, SCP Partners; General, US Army, Retired
 John Kerr,  member, House of Lords; Deputy Chairman, Royal Dutch Shell plc
 Henry Kissinger,  chairman of Kissinger Associates, Inc.
 Klaus Kleinfeld, chairman and CEO, Alcoa
 Mustafa V. Koç, chairman, Koç Holding A.S.
 Henry R. Kravis,  co-chairman and co-CEO, Kohlberg Kravis Roberts & Co.
 Marie-Josée Kravis,  senior fellow, Hudson Institute, Inc.
 Neelie Kroes, vice president, European Commission; commissioner for Digital Agenda
 André Kudelski, chairman and CEO, Kudelski Group SA
 Richard Lambert, independent non-executive director, Ernst & Young
 Pascal Lamy, director general, World Trade Organization
 Bernardino León Gross, secretary general of the Spanish Presidency
 Doris Leuthard, federal councillor
 Maurice Lévy, chairman and CEO, Publicis Groupe S.A.
 Thomas Leysen, chairman, Umicore
 Cheng Li, senior fellow and director of research, John L. Thornton China Center, Brookings Institution
 Peter Löscher, president and CEO, Siemens AG
 Peter Mandelson, member, House of Lords; chairman, Global Counsel
 Michael McDowell, senior counsel, Law Library; former deputy prime minister
 Frank McKenna, deputy chair, TD Bank Financial Group
 John Micklethwait, editor-in-chief, The Economist
 Thierry de Montbrial, president, French Institute for International Relations
 Mario Monti,  president, Universita Commerciale Luigi Bocconi
 Alexey A. Mordashov, CEO, Severstal
 Craig J. Mundie, chief research and strategy officer, Microsoft Corporation
 Egil Myklebust, former chairman of the board of directors of SAS, Norsk Hydro ASA
 Matthias Nass, chief international correspondent, Die Zeit
 Queen Beatrix of the Netherlands
 Juan María Nin Génova,  president and CEO, La Caixa
 António Nogueira Leite, member of the board, José de Mello Investimentos, SGPS, SA
 Prince Haakon of Norway
 Jorma Ollila, chairman, Royal Dutch Shell plc
 James Orbinski, professor of medicine and political science, University of Toronto
 Peter R. Orszag, vice chairman, Citigroup Global Markets, Inc.
 George Osborne, chancellor of the Exchequer
 Ole Petter Ottersen, rector, University of Oslo
 Şefika Pekin, founding partner, Pekin & Bayar Law Firm 
 Mikael Pentikäinen, publisher and Senior Editor-in-Chief, Helsingin Sanomat
 Richard N. Perle,  resident fellow, American Enterprise Institute for Public Policy Research
 Robert S. Prichard, chair, Torys LLP
 Heather Reisman, chair and CEO, Indigo Books & Music Inc.
 David Rockefeller, former chairman, Chase Manhattan Bank
 Herman Van Rompuy, president, European Council
 Charlie Rose,  executive editor and anchor, Charlie Rose
 Uri Rosenthal, Minister of Foreign Affairs
 Walter Rothensteiner, chairman of the board, Raiffeisen Zentralbank Österreich AG
 Olivier Roy, professor of social and political theory, European University Institute
 Robert E. Rubin, co-chairman, Council on Foreign Relations; former secretary of the Treasury
 Paolo Scaroni, CEO, Eni S.p.A.
 Martin Schmid, president, Government of the Canton Grisons
 Eric Schmidt, executive chairman, Google Inc.
 Rudolf Scholten,  member of the board of executive directors, Oesterreichische Kontrollbank AG
 Peter Schütze, member of the executive management, Nordea Bank AB
 Rolf Schweiger, member of the Swiss Council of States
 Josette Sheeran, executive director, United Nations World Food Programme
 Rolf Soiron, chairman of the board, Holcim Ltd., Lonza Ltd.
 Javier Solana Madariaga, president, ESADEgeo Center for Global Economy and Geopolitics
 Erna Solberg, Leader of the Conservative Party
 Queen Sofía of Spain
 James B. Steinberg, Deputy Secretary of State
 Peer Steinbrück, member of the Bundestag; former minister of Finance
 Rory Stewart, Member of Parliament
 Peter D. Sutherland,  chairman, Goldman Sachs International
 Martin Taylor, chairman, Syngenta International AG
 Peter A. Thiel, president, Clarium Capital Management, LLC
 Giulio Tremonti, Minister of Economy and Finance
 Jean-Claude Trichet, president, European Central Bank
 Loukas Tsoukalis, president, ELIAMEP
 Christine A. Varney, assistant attorney general for antitrust
 Daniel L. Vasella, chairman, Novartis AG
 James W. Vaupel, founding director, Max Planck Institute for Demographic Research
 Jacob Wallenberg, chairman, Investor AB
 Kevin Warsh, former governor, Federal Reserve Board
 Jaap Winter, partner, De Brauw Blackstone Westbroek 
 Jürg Witmer, chairman, Givaudan SA and Clariant AG
 James D. Wolfensohn,  chairman, Wolfensohn & Company, LLC
 Robert B. Zoellick, president, The World Bank Group

References
 Delegations of 2011

External links
 Official site

2011 conferences
2011 in international relations
2011